All or Nothing: Manchester City is an Amazon Original docuseries as part of the All or Nothing brand. In the series, English Premier League side Manchester City's progress was charted through their 2017–18 season, in which they won two of four contested trophies and broke a series of Premier League performance-related records.

It was announced when news of the story leaked that Amazon had paid Manchester City the sum of £10m for the behind-the-scenes video access.

The series was narrated by Sir Ben Kingsley, who grew up in Salford, Greater Manchester.

Episodes

Controversy
By unilaterally signing an agreement with Amazon to film the series, including unprecedented behind the scenes access, Manchester City reportedly greatly angered Premier League broadcaster Sky Sports, who took issue with the fact that City granted access not even offered to match broadcasters in exchange for a large sum of money. Sky's response came hot on the heels of stories suggesting that they were already having to offer large discounts and deals to new customers in the wake of the competition raised by Amazon Prime and Netflix to Sky's existing online entertainment business, and amidst talk that Amazon were preparing to move into match-day broadcasting also.

The series' access was also raised again when it transpired that bitter rivals Manchester United refused access to the cameras to the tunnel and the dressing rooms, although the club themselves claimed this was because they felt their corridors would be too crowded with an extra camera crew present. The denied request became particularly pertinent when City's victory and the ensuing celebrations led to a massed brawl between players and staff of both teams which resulted in City assistant coach Mikel Arteta requiring stitches on his forehead.

References

External links 
 

Manchester City
Manchester City F.C.
Association football documentary television series
2018 British television series debuts
2018 British television series endings
Amazon Prime Video original programming
Television series by Amazon Studios